Cliff Rickard (born 1943) is an Australian Paralympic athlete, snooker player and table tennis player.

At the 1972 Heidelberg Games, he won a silver medal in the Men's Tetraplegic snooker  event and competed in athletics and table tennis.

He has been a member of Wheelchair Sports WA since 1960 and has served on the executive in every capacity except treasurer. In 1990, he was made life member of Wheelchair Sports WA.  He was a founding board member of WA Disabled Sports Association. From 1985 to 1990, he was president of the Australian Wheelchair Sports Association. In 2011, he was  President of Wheelchair Sports WA's Senior Wheelies Committee. In 2000, he was awarded the Australian Sports Medal.

He is married to Maureen and between them they have two sons and two daughters.

References

External links
 
 

Paralympic athletes of Australia
Paralympic snooker players of Australia
Paralympic table tennis players of Australia
Athletes (track and field) at the 1972 Summer Paralympics
Snooker players at the 1972 Summer Paralympics
Table tennis players at the 1972 Summer Paralympics
Medalists at the 1972 Summer Paralympics
Paralympic silver medalists for Australia
Wheelchair category Paralympic competitors
Recipients of the Australian Sports Medal
Sportsmen from Western Australia
1943 births
Living people
Paralympic bronze medalists for Australia
Paralympic medalists in snooker